A multi-factor authentication fatigue attack (or MFA fatigue attack) is a computer security attack against multi-factor authentication that makes use of social engineering.

Method 
When MFA applications are configured to send push notifications to end users, an attacker can send a flood of login attempt in the hope that a user will click on accept at least once.

Defenses 
In 2022, Microsoft has deployed a mitigation against MFA fatigue attacks with their authenticator app.

Further reading

References 

Computer security